Parrel may refer to:
 Parrel beads, a part of a sailing vessel's rigging
 Parrel, synonym of the Trepat variety of wine grape

See also
 Parral (disambiguation)